Greatest Hits is a compilation album by English pop band The Korgis. It was released by Armoury Records Germany in 2001.

Track listing
"All the Love in the World" (Davis, Warren) - 3:38
 Single edit. Original version on 1981 album Sticky George
"If I Had You" (Davis, Rachmaninoff) - 3:54
 From 1979 album The Korgis
"If It's Alright With You Baby" (Warren) - 4:01
 From 1980 album Dumb Waiters
"Everybody's Got to Learn Sometime" (Warren) - 4:13
 From 1980 album Dumb Waiters
"Can't We Be Friends Now" (Warren) - 4:01
 From 1981 album Sticky George
"Love Ain't Too Far Away" (Davis) - 3:29
 From 1980 album Dumb Waiters
"Nowhere to Run" (Davis, Warren) - 4:15
 Original 1981 album version from Sticky George
"Perfect Hostess" (Davis) - 3:21
 From 1980 album Dumb Waiters
"Drawn and Quartered" (Warren) - 3:17
 From 1980 album Dumb Waiters
"It's No Good Unless You Love Me" (Warren) - 3:22
 From 1980 album Dumb Waiters
"That Was My Big Mistake" (Davis, Warren) - 4:01
 Single edit. Original version on 1981 album Sticky George
"Sticky George" (Harrison, Warren) - 3:36
 From 1981 album Sticky George
"I Just Can't Help It" (Davis) - 3:44
 Single remix. Original version on 1979 album The Korgis
"Don't Say That It's Over" (Warren) - 2:46
 From 1981 album Sticky George
"Living on the Rocks" (Warren) - 3:32
 From 1981 album Sticky George
"O Maxine" (Warren) - 2:39
 From 1979 album The Korgis
"Domestic Bliss" (Gordon, Harrison, Warren) - 3:15
 From 1981 album Sticky George

Release history
 2001 Armoury Records Germany ARMCD055

The Korgis albums
2001 greatest hits albums